L'Astragale is a 2015 French drama film directed by Brigitte Sy. It is the second film adaptation of the 1965 semi-autobiographical novel L'Astragale by Albertine Sarrazin, after Guy Casaril's L'Astragale (1968).

Cast 

 Leïla Bekhti as Albertine Damien
 Reda Kateb as Julien
 Esther Garrel as Marie
 Jocelyne Desverchère as Nini
 India Hair as Suzy
 Jean-Charles Dumay as Roger
 Jean-Benoît Ugeux as Marcel
 Louis Garrel as Jacky
 Delphine Chuillot as Catherine
 Zimsky as Riton 
 Billie Blain as Coco 
 Brigitte Sy as Rita
 Suzanne Huin as Marilyne
 Yann Gael as Etienne
 Damien Bonnard as Young cop

Accolades

References

External links 
 

2015 films
2015 drama films
2010s French-language films
French drama films
French neo-noir films
Films set in the 1950s
Films based on French novels
French black-and-white films
Films directed by Brigitte Sy
Films produced by Paulo Branco
2010s French films